A dirnitz ( or Türnitz, from the Slavic dorniza = "heated parlour") or Knights' Hall was the heatable area of a medieval castle. It was usually a single large room on the ground floor of the palas below the Great hall. It was often expensively furnished and had a decorative vault. Occasionally it also described the cabinet (Kemenate) or an entire hall building. The term is German.

From the mid-15th century, the dirnitz, if used as a reception or gathering room or as a courtroom, was sometimes also called a courtroom (Hofstube).

Typical examples of a dirnitz may be seen at the Wartburg and Heinfels Castle. The dirnitz at Burghausen Castle is one of the rare examples where the heatable hall is on an upper storey.

Literature 

 Horst Wolfgang Böhme, Reinhard Friedrich, Barbara Schock-Werner (ed.): Wörterbuch der Burgen, Schlösser und Festungen. Philipp Reclam, Stuttgart, 2004, p. 113.

Castle architecture